Mitromorpha suarezi is a species of sea snail, a marine gastropod mollusk in the family Mitromorphidae.

Description
The length of the shell attains 4.7 mm.

Distribution
This marine species occurs off the island Príncipe, Gulf of Guinea.

References

 Rolàn, E. & Gori, S., 2012. New species of neogastropods from the islands of the Gulf of Guinea, West Africa. Iberus 30(1): 53–66

External links
 MNHN, Paris: Mitromorpha suarezi (holotype)

suarezi
Invertebrates of São Tomé and Príncipe
Fauna of Príncipe
Gastropods described in 2012